Paul Alfred Pételot (1885–1965) was a French botanist and entomologist, whose primary scholarly focus was on medicinal plants in Southeast Asia. Some sources list his date of death as 1940, but several herbaria specimens are recorded as being collected by him up until 1944 including Carex kucyniakii (1944), Teijsmanniodendron peteloti (1941), Amalocalyx microlobus (1941), Amalocalyx microlobus (1942), Trichosanthes kerrii (1944) and Siraitia siamensis (1944). In addition, he continued to author publications through the 1950s, though it is possible these are posthumous.

Life 
Pételot was born in Saint-Max, France in 1885. His first professional posting was in 1908 as a member of the botany faculty at Nancy-Université. He then worked in Brazil and St. Petersburg, Russia before returning to France.  In 1919 he was working in the cryptogamy department of the French National Museum of Natural History and had been accepted as a member of the French Society of Plant Pathology and the Botanical Society of France. He then moved to Southeast Asia and in 1922 joined the entomological station of Cho-Gank (Tonkin) and became a professor at the Hanoi School of Agriculture. He moved to Saigon to become a lecturer at the Mixed Faculty of Medicine and Pharmacy and then led the botanical division of the Scientific and Technical Research Center. He was elected as a laureate of the French Academy of Sciences.

Work 
He collected a large number of botanical specimens from Southeast Asia which have been deposited in the French National Museum of Natural History.

Legacy 
He is the authority on botanical taxa including: 

Several taxa are named in his honor including:

Petelotiella Gagnep.
Aganosma petelotii Lý
Allophylus petelotii Merr.
Ardisia petelotii E.Walker
Arisaema petelotii K.Krause
Aristolochia petelotii O.C.Schmidt
Artabotrys petelotii Merr.
Artocarpus petelotii Gagnep.
Asarum petelotii O.C.Schmidt
Callicarpa petelotii Dop
Camellia petelotii (Merr.) Sealy
Carex petelotii Gross
Casearia petelotii Merr.
Cleistanthus petelotii Merr. ex Croizat
Clethra Petelotii Dop & Troch.-Marq.
Cryptochilus petelotii Gagnep.
Digitaria petelotii Henrard
Dioscorea petelotii Prain & Burkill
Disepalum petelotii (Merr.) D.M.Johnson
Dracontomelon petelotii Tardieu
Elaeocarpus petelotii Merr.
Elatostema petelotii Gagnep.
Elytranthe petelotii Merr.
Eremochloa petelotii Merr.
Fosbergia petelotii Merr. ex Tirveng. & Sastre
Glycosmis petelotii Guillaumin
Habenaria petelotii Gagnep.
Helicia petelotii Merr.
Homalium petelotii Merr.
Hydrocotyle petelotii Tardieu
Illicium petelotii A.C.Sm.
Indocalamus petelotii (A.Camus) Ohrnb.
Isachne petelotii A.Camus
Lecanthus petelotii (Gagnep.) C.J.Chen
Liparis petelotii Gagnep.
Lithocarpus petelotii A.Camus
Lysimachia petelotii Merr.
Lysionotus petelotii Pellegr.
Medinilla petelotii Merr.
Microtropis petelotii Merr. & F.L.Freeman
Mitrephora petelotii Weeras. & R.M.K.Saunders
Paramignya petelotii Guillaumin
Pedicularis petelotii P.C.Tsoong
Phyllanthus petelotii Croizat
Phyllocyclus petelotii (Merr.) Thiv
Pogostemon petelotii Doan ex Gang Yao, Y.F.Deng & X.J.Ge
Primula petelotii W.W.Sm.
Quercus petelotii A.Camus
Raphiocarpus petelotii (Pellegr.) B.L.Burtt
Schefflera petelotii Merr.
Scirpus petelotii Gross
Selaginella petelotii Alston
Smilax petelotii T.Koyama
Sporoxeia petelotii (Merr.) C.Hansen
Staurogyne petelotii Benoist
Teucrium petelotii Doan ex Suddee & A.J.Paton
Thelypteris petelotii Ching
Vaccinium petelotii Merr.
Viola petelotii W.Becker ex Gagnep.

References 

20th-century French botanists
1885 births
1965 deaths
Academic staff of Nancy-Université
National Museum of Natural History (France) people
Members of the French Academy of Sciences